Tessy may refer to:

People
Tessy Antony de Nassau (born 1985), Luxembourgian businesswoman and non-profit executive, a former member of the Grand Ducal Family of Luxembourg
Tessy Bamberg-Schitter (born 1980), Luxembourgian football midfielder
Tessy María López Goerne (born 1961), Mexican nanotechnologist
Tessy Ojo (born 1971), British-Nigerian charity executive
Tessy Okoli (born c. 1966), Nigerian educator
Tessy Scholtes (born 1981), Luxembourgian karateka and politician
Tessy Thomas (born 1963), Indian scientist
Tessy van de Ven (born 1983), Dutch former professional tennis player

Places
Épagny Metz-Tessy, commune in the Haute-Savoie department of southeastern France since 2016
Metz-Tessy, former commune in the Haute-Savoie department of southeastern France, merged into Épagny Metz-Tessy
Tessy-Bocage, commune in the Manche department of northwestern France since 2016
Tessy-sur-Vire, former commune in the Manche department of northwestern France, merged into Tessy-Bocage

See also
 Tess (disambiguation)
 Tessie (disambiguation)